Szerencs Subregion Borsod-Abaúj-Zemplén fourth largest of the subregions of Hungary. Area : 498,95 km². Population : 44 337 (2009)

Settlements:
 Alsódobsza
 Bekecs
 Golop
 Legyesbénye
 Mád
 Megyaszó
 Mezőzombor
 Monok
 Prügy
 Rátka
 Sóstófalva
 Szerencs
 Taktaharkány
 Taktakenéz
 Taktaszada
 Tállya
 Tiszalúc
 Újcsanálos

See also
Szerencs District (from 2013)

References 

Subregions of Hungary